The first World Cup of Softball was held in Oklahoma City, Oklahoma USA between July 14 and July 18, 2005.  Japan won their first World Cup by defeating USA 3-1 in the Championship game.

Final standings

Preliminary round

Position Round

Teams

External links
 2005 World Cup Results on the USA Softball Website

World Cup of Softball
World Cup Of Softball, 2005